Willingham is a village in Cambridgeshire, England. It is located in the South Cambridgeshire district and sits just outside the border of the Fens, just south of the River Great Ouse.

Located approximately 12 miles (19 km) northwest of Cambridge, on the B1050 road, Willingham Parish occupies , and had a population in 2007 of 3,900 people, increasing to 4,015 at the Census 2011.

History
The name Willingham probably originated from being the homestead of the family or followers of a man called "Wifel" and was called Vuivlingeham c. 1050 and Wivelingham around 1086. The name Wivelingham was also used to refer to the village until the 18th century.

The area at the edge of the fens to the north of the present village was already occupied by the 2nd century, though these were at some point abandoned. The Aldreth causeway, which formed the main route between Cambridge and Ely in medieval times and perhaps dating from the Bronze Age, runs through the east of the parish past Belsar's Hill, and until the opening of the Cambridge-Ely turnpike in 1768, carriage traffic would have run through Willingham.

One of the oldest houses in the village dates from the 15th century. Willingham's history is closely associated to its position on the edge of the Fens and it was only with the major efforts to drain the Fens during the 17th century that the parish took its modern structure. It was only with the construction of the sluice at Earith in 1650 which diverted the flow of the Ouse from the Old West into the New Bedford River that the parish was able to remain largely unflooded. Additional areas were drained by windmills until replaced by steam pumps in the mid-19th century.

Willingham's registered population grew from 23 at the time of the Domesday Book in 1086 to 79 in 1251, and in 1377 the poll tax was paid by 287 adults. By 1801 the population was almost 800 inhabitants growing to more than 1,600 in 1851 despite a wave of emigration to America in the 1830s. Numbers then remained generally constant until the 1960s when it grew rapidly again, and passing 2,500 by 1981 and 3,436 in 2001.

A local man named Jabez Few, who died in the 1920s, was regarded by the townspeople of Willingham as a witch. They claimed that the white mice he kept were his familiar spirits, and that they could not be got rid of after his death until they were held over running water. In 1940 a German spy parachuted into Willingham, was eventually captured and turned into a double agent.

Church

Evidence of Christian Anglo-Saxon activity in Willingham has been found, and there has probably been a church in the village since at least the 12th century. The present church of St Mary and All Saints was built on the foundations of the 12th-century building. Mainly constructed in the 14th century, it consists of a chancel with north vestry, nave, a south porch and a west tower with an unusual spire. It has notable 14th and 15th-century figure paintings, including a rare picture of a pregnant Virgin Mary.

Village life

Willingham has a primary school, library, surgery, post office and a number of shops and restaurants. There are currently three pubs in the village — the Duke of Wellington, The Bank and The Porterhouse Pub. The first recorded alehouses were the George in 1665 and the Five Bells in 1671 though by the late 19th century the number had risen to 16 with the George and the Vine the most notable. The White Hart opened in 1910; there were still 7 pubs in 1933 and 5 in 1982, of which the oldest was the Duke of Wellington, known as the Warriors in the 18th century.

The village has a number of amenities for young people provided by the Willingham Youth Trust and a well established Scout Group.

Willingham also has a football club named Willingham Wolves. It's not known for sure why they took the name of Wolves, though it was presumably for alliteration. Today the club offers grass-roots football to almost 300+ players from as young as 5 all the way to men's and ladies senior teams. 

A bus service links Willingham and surrounding villages with Cambridge and St Ives.

Villages adjacent to Willingham include Earith, Over, Rampton, Longstanton and Bar Hill. The village of Willingham is a direct neighbour of the new town of Northstowe, which is currently in Phase 2 of construction.

References

External links

Willingham Parish Council
Willingham Life
Photos of Old Willingham
Willingham Village Facebook Page
Willingham Youth Trust
Willingham Scout Group
Willingham Wolves Football Club
Fen Edge Community Association
Willingham entry in the Victoria County History at British History Online
Willingham village site

Villages in Cambridgeshire
Civil parishes in Cambridgeshire
South Cambridgeshire District